The 2016 Dallas Cowboys season was the franchise's 57th season in the National Football League (NFL), the eighth playing their home games at AT&T Stadium and the 6th full season under head coach Jason Garrett.

After losing their first game to the New York Giants, the Cowboys won 11 straight games. The streak ended with them losing again to the same team in week 14, making this the first time since 2011 that the Cowboys were swept by the Giants. With division rivals Washington Redskins losing to the Arizona Cardinals in Week 13, the Cowboys clinched a playoff berth after missing the playoffs the previous year. Following the Giants' loss to the Philadelphia Eagles in Week 16, the Cowboys became NFC East champions for the second time in three years and clinched home-field advantage throughout the playoffs for the first time since 2007. The 13–3 record, which was 9 wins more than in the disastrous 2015 season, is tied for the best record in team history, equaling its 1992 and 2007 records. However, despite having the NFC's top seed as well as home-field advantage, the Cowboys suffered a devastating loss in the divisional round of the playoffs to the Green Bay Packers by a score of 34–31, ending their season and extending their NFC Championship game drought to 22 seasons. This was also QB Tony Romo's last season in the NFL, as he announced his retirement on April 4, 2017. The Cowboys became the first team since the AFL-NFL merger to rise from the bottom of the NFC to the top seed in one season.

Offseason

Background
Coming into the offseason the Cowboys had a few positions that concerned them as a result of injuries, suspensions, and players potentially leaving the team. The positions that were of most concern were quarterback, defensive back, and pass rusher. The Cowboys had a total of eighteen players entering the free agency, which meant the players were free to negotiate with and sign a contract to play with any team in the league. Of the eighteen players, two of them were restricted free agents, which meant they could get offers from other teams, and the Cowboys would have opportunity to match the offer and keep the player on their roster. The free agency process officially started on March 9 for all thirty-two teams.

Offense

After losing ten out of the eleven games without Romo in 2015, the Dallas Cowboys wanted to find a reliable back up quarterback, either through the draft, or by signing a veteran free agent. The Cowboys met with the top three quarterbacks entering the draft:  Jared Goff, Carson Wentz,  and Paxton Lynch, all of whom were projected to be drafted in the first round. Another prospect for the Cowboys was Mississippi State quarterback Dak Prescott, who met with the team on four separate occasions leading some to believe he would be their target in the middle rounds of the draft. Including Prescott, Goff, Wentz and Lynch, the Cowboys had pre-draft meetings with a total of seven quarterbacks entering the draft.   Cowboys also looked at veteran quarterback Matt Moore, having him visit with the organization in March before he re-signed with the Miami Dolphins later in the month. After a mediocre performance the previous year, quarterback Matt Cassel entered free agency. Tight end James Hanna re-signed with the Cowboys with a three-year contract worth $8.2 million on March 11. Running back Lance Dunbar re-signed to a one-year contract worth $1.7 million on March 17. After the window to receive offers from other teams while being a restricted free agent closed, guard Ronald Leary re-signed with the Cowboys for a one-year deal worth $2.5 million on April 28.

Defense

On the defensive side of the team the Cowboys were coming off a year where they only had 8 interceptions, and needed to make improvements with their defensive backs. Orlando Scandrick who was a starting cornerback for the team in 2013 and 2014, was still recovering from the ACL and MCL injury that happened during practice in 2015 causing him to miss the entire season. Cornerbacks Josh Thomas and Morris Claiborne both were unrestricted free agents and could potentially be signed by another team. Within the first two days after free agency started, they both were re-signed to the Cowboys, Claiborne for a one-year deal worth $3 million, and Thomas for a one-year contract. Defensive backs Nolan Carroll, Leon Hall and Patrick Robinson were brought in to meet with the Cowboys during free agency. Safety Jeff Heath re-signed for a four-year contract worth $7.6 million on April 13.

In regards to their needs with the pass rush Sports Illustrated writer Chris Burke said that defensive end was the position that most needed to be improve for the Cowboys. Defensive end Randy Gregory had a suspension for the first four games of the season as a result of abusing the leagues substance abuse policy, which would later be increased by ten games. One of the Cowboys other defensive ends, DeMarcus Lawrence was recovering from back surgery spreading their defensive line even more thin. Defensive tackle Nick Hayden, defensive ends Greg Hardy, Jeremy Mincey and Jack Crawford, all were entering the free agency. Crawford was the only one to be re-signed and was given a one-year deal worth $1.1 million on March 9. Defensive end Jason Jones was brought in to visit the Cowboys on March 28. Linebacker Kyle Wilber re-signed for a two-year contract worth $3.2 million on March 11.

Departures

Of the eighteen Cowboys players who were in the free agency, the Cowboys were able to re-sign ten of them for the 2016 season. From those ten, linebacker Rolando McClain was re-signed on March 9, but due to a suspension he received from the league for violating the NFL's drug policy he missed the entire season. Offensive tackle Charles Brown was re-signed on March 10, but in July decided to retire and was placed on the reserved/retired list. From the eight that weren't re-signed, four of them signed with other teams. The first of these three was quarterback Matt Cassel, who left for the free agency after being benched in the previous season when he lost six of his seven games as a starter. He went on to be signed by the Tennessee Titans on March 9. The next player to sign with another team was offensive lineman Mackenzy Bernadeau who signed a contract with the Jacksonville Jaguars on March 11. Next up was running back Robert Turbin who signed a contract with the Indianapolis Colts on March 15. The last player to sign with another team was defensive tackle Nick Hayden who signed with the Cleveland Browns in March, but ended up being released in August and not playing during the season. Players that did not sign with the Cowboys or any other teams included defensive end Greg Hardy who was a free agent that had a lot of off the field issues. It was reported that Hardy not being re-signed was likely more due to fitting in with the Cowboys locker room rather than due to the off the field issues. Defensive end Jeremy Mincey decided to retired in August. The last two free agents, 31 year old fullback Tyler Clutts and 28 year old safety Danny McCray both were not re-signed, speculated to be due to their age.

Acquisitions

While most of the activity made by the Cowboys during free agency was re-signing their own players, they also made a few acquisitions of players from other teams to add to their roster. Defensive end Cedric Thornton was the first to be acquired, signing a four-year contract worth $18 million on March 10. Thorton comes from one of the Cowboys divisional rivals, the Philadelphia Eagles, and will being moving from defensive end to defensive tackle. At the time of his signing, he was believed to be the likely replacement for Hayden who was still in the free agency. Continuing to work on the improvement of their defensive line, the next acquisition for the Cowboys was defensive end Benson Mayowa from the Oakland Raiders, who signed a three-year contract on March 18 worth $8.5 million. Mayowa was a restricted free agent, and the Raiders had five days to match the offer to retain him, but they declined to do so, allowing the Cowboys to improve their pass rush some more. The next free agent acquisition was from another divisional rival, when the Cowboys signed Washington Redskins running back Alfred Morris. Morris signed a contract on March 22 for 2 years and worth $3.5 million. Morris will be added into the running back rotation with starter Darren McFadden, who replaced Joseph Randle last year as the starter after Randle was injured and later cut for off the field issues. The final free agent acquisition the Cowboys made was offensive lineman Joe Looney from the Tennessee Titans, who was signed on March 29. He is a flexible player who can play both center and guard, similar to the role Bernadeau had. Looney's contract was for two years and worth $1.6 million.

2016 NFL draft

The Dallas Cowboys had nine draft picks for the 2016 NFL draft which was scheduled to take place from April 28 to April 30 in Chicago, Illinois. The Cowboys originally had only five picks as a results of trades with the Raiders, 49ers and Seahawks, but were awarded four compensatory picks on March 11 as a result of the net loss of players in free agency before the 2015 season. One of the compensatory picks received was a fourth round draft pick, and the other three picks were all in the sixth round. After all the trades and the compensatory picks given, the Cowboys had one pick in each of the first three rounds, two picks in the fourth, zero in the fifth, four picks in the sixth round, and zero in the seventh. In January Neil Hornsby, the founder of Pro Football Focus, ranked the offseason needs for the Dallas Cowboys, and said the top needs for the draft were quarterback, cornerback, guard, and running back. Leading up to the draft two of these needs, running back and guard, were addressed with the addition of Morris and Looney to the team during free agency. As the draft got closer on April 26, Bleacher Report also listed running back, quarterback and cornerback in their top five needs for the Cowboys in the draft, along with defensive end and safety.

With the fourth overall pick in the draft, the Cowboys used their first round selection to draft Ezekiel Elliott from Ohio State. Prior to the draft the Cowboys had met with Elliott on two separate occasions, once in Ohio, and a second time in Dallas. Elliott averaged seven yards per carry during his three-year college career, and had over 1,800 yards in both of his final two years. In the 2015 season, Elliott was named unanimously to the first team of the All-Big Ten Conference, and second on the  2015 College Football All-America Team. Along with being first team Big Ten, Elliott was also named the offensive player of the year and the MVP for the conference. In the 2014 season he and the Ohio State Buckeyes won the Big Ten Championship along with the College Football National Championship in which Elliott was named MVP. In early February during an interview on NFL Network when asked about which team he wanted to be picked by, Elliott responded with: "The Dallas Cowboys. I want to go play behind that great offensive line they have down in Dallas." Elliott was expected to help the Cowboys in the running game as he would be behind what was considered by some to be the best offensive line in the NFL. Elliott's presence would also help with the passing game due to his blocking abilities and the fact that defenses would have to respect the backfield with him there, which would increase the effectiveness of play-action passes. Elliott became the third running back to be drafted by the Cowboys with a top-20 pick. The previous two picks, Tony Dorsett in  1977 and Emmitt Smith in 1990 ended up being inducted into the Pro Football Hall of Fame, the latter also is the NFL's all-time leading rusher.

In the second round of the draft, the Cowboys selected Notre Dame linebacker Jaylon Smith with the 34th overall pick. Smith was named first team All-American in 2015, and led his team in tackles. Smith also won the Butkus Award, which is awarded to the best linebacker in the country at the high school, college, and professional levels. This was the second time Smith had won the award, the previous time in 2013 as a senior in high school. In the Fiesta Bowl game versus Ohio State, Smith suffered a knee injury that later was determined to be a torn ACL and torn MCL. With the injury to his knee, it was expected for him to miss a significant amount of time, potentially the entire season. The Cowboys team doctor was the ones to perform the surgery to repair his knee before the draft, so it was believed they might have a bit more knowledge of the situation than other teams. With their third round and fourth round picks, the Cowboys shifted their focus to the defensive line. In the third, with the 67th overall pick, the Cowboys selected Nebraska defensive tackle Maliek Collins. In the fourth round with the 101st overall pick, the Cowboys selected Charles Tapper, a defensive end out of Oklahoma. In 2015 Collins was named to the second team All-Big Ten Conference, and Tapper was first team All-Big 12 Conference.

After selecting Elliott early in the first, the Cowboys attempted to trade with multiple teams for another first round selection in order to draft quarterback Paxton Lynch. They were unsuccessful in finding a trade and it wasn't until their second fourth round pick that they decided on a quarterback with Mississippi State's Dak Prescott being selected 135th overall. Prescott was selected with one of the compensatory picks the Cowboys received for the draft. This marks the first time since  the Cowboys have drafted a quarterback. While Prescott was the starter for Mississippi State, he broke 38 school records and lead them to a #1 ranking in 2014 for the first time in the school's history. Prescott was named to first team of both the 2014 and 2015 All-SEC football teams. Prescott was quickly compared to Tony Romo, being similar in size and being able to make plays with their feet. Prescott's athletic talents contributed greatly to the Cowboys picking him, but team official also noted his locker room presence and leadership abilities as influencing the decision as well. Prescott will enter training camp and try to compete with Kellen Moore for the backup quarterback role for the season, and then work towards become a starter, a task he accomplished both in high school and college. The Cowboys looked forward to developing Prescott over the years and were confident he was a worthwhile talent. When asked about not being the Cowboys first choice to draft, in regards to the attempt to trade up for Lynch, Dak responded with: “I'm sure at Mississippi State I wasn't the first one on the recruit board when I committed there. Everything works out and happens for a reason."

With no picks in the fifth or seventh round, the Cowboys finished their draft in the sixth round where they had four picks. Their first two picks were two defensive backs, Anthony Brown a cornerback from Purdue, selected 189th overall, and Kavon Frazier a safety from Central Michigan, selected 212th overall. Brown showed off his impressive speed at the NFL combine, where he ran the 40 yard dash in 4.35 seconds, the second fastest time of all cornerbacks attending. Brown was an honorable mention for the All-Big Ten Conference team, while Frazier was named second team All-MAC Conference. The Cowboys switched their focus back to the offense with their next two picks and selected back to back with the 216th and 217th overall picks. First was Darius Jackson a running back from Eastern Michigan, then followed up with Rico Gathers a basketball player out of Baylor with intentions to play tight end. Jackson was third team All-Mac Conference, and is expected to use his ability to catch the ball from the backfield to fill the void that will be left at start of season while Lance Dunbar is out after a knee surgery. Gathers hasn't played football since he was 13 years old, but was an honorable mention AP All-American college basketball athlete.

Notes
 The Cowboys conditionally traded their fifth-round selection to the Oakland Raiders for wide receiver Brice Butler and the Raiders' 2016 sixth-round selection.
 The Cowboys traded a sixth-round selection to the San Francisco 49ers in exchange for the 49ers' 2015 seventh-round selection.
 The Cowboys traded their seventh-round selection to the Seattle Seahawks in exchange for running back Christine Michael.

Staff

Rosters

Opening preseason roster

Week one roster

Final roster

Preseason

Regular season

Schedule

Note: Intra-division opponents are in bold text.

Game summaries

Week 1: vs. New York Giants

The Cowboys fell short trying to win their home opener against the Giants in a hard-fought game. They dropped to 0–1 and lost to the Giants at AT&T Stadium for the first time since 2012.

Ezekiel Elliott struggled to find holes all game, but managed to record his first NFL touchdown. The Dallas defense failed to contain the Giants' rushing attack. The game also saw the return of Victor Cruz, who caught the game-clinching touchdown pass from Eli Manning.

Dallas' final play, a 14-yard catch-and-run by Terrance Williams, put them in field goal range, but he stayed inbounds and time expired.

Week 2: at Washington Redskins

Rookie quarterback Dak Prescott was impressive in his second NFL start, rushing for a touchdown and playing mistake-free football as Dallas evened its record at 1–1 with a win over its long-time rival.

Barry Church's interception of Kirk Cousins in the end zone late in the fourth quarter sealed the game.

Week 3: vs. Chicago Bears

Dallas won its first home game in over a year as it dispatched of the Bears, who were without normal starting quarterback Jay Cutler and instead started Brian Hoyer. Ezekiel Elliott ran for 140 yards on 30 carries in just his third NFL game and Dak Prescott threw his first NFL touchdown pass to Dez Bryant.

Week 4: at San Francisco 49ers

The Cowboys rallied from an early 14-point hole to win over the 49ers on the road, winning their third straight game in the process. Ezekiel Elliott went over the century mark again, rushing for 138 yards and a touchdown.

Week 5: vs. Cincinnati Bengals

Dak Prescott extended his consecutive passes to begin a career without an interception streak to 155, trailing only Tom Brady all-time. Ezekiel Elliott rushed for 134 yards on only 15 carries, including a 60-yard touchdown run. The win put Dallas a half-game ahead of the Eagles for first place in the NFC East.

Week 6: at Green Bay Packers

It was the third straight year that the Cowboys traveled to Lambeau Field to face the Packers. Despite Dak Prescott being picked off for the first time this season, he still managed 247 passing yards and three touchdowns. He also passed Tom Brady's all-time record of consecutive pass attempts to start a career without an interception.

Ezekiel Elliott pounded the Green Bay Packers number one ranked run defense with 157 yards on 28 carries.

The Dallas defense dominated the Packers, forcing four Green Bay turnovers. It was the first time since 2008, and second time in franchise history that the Cowboys had won at Lambeau Field. With the 30–16 victory, the Cowboys went 5–1 heading into the bye week.

Week 8: vs. Philadelphia Eagles

Hoping to continue their winning streak, the Cowboys hosted the Philadelphia Eagles in a primetime matchup duel between Dak Prescott and Carson Wentz. Jason Witten's touchdown in overtime sealed the victory for the Cowboys, who went 6–1; this was the Cowboys' first victory against the Eagles at AT&T Stadium since 2012.

Week 9: at Cleveland Browns

The winless Browns had no answer for Dak Prescott who threw three touchdown passes in a 35–10 win and improving the Cowboys to 7–1 for the first time since 2007.

Week 10: at Pittsburgh Steelers

A classic rivalry since the 1970s, the Cowboys traveled to Pittsburgh to take on the Steelers, who were coming off a three-game losing streak (including a loss to the Baltimore Ravens the previous week). With the win, the Cowboys extended their winning streak to eight games for the first time since 1977. Ezekiel Elliott reached 1,000 yards in this game and rushed for the game-winning touchdown in the space of 30 seconds. The Cowboys also clinched a non-losing season as they had the best win–loss record in the NFL.

Week 11: vs. Baltimore Ravens

The Cowboys returned home to take on the Baltimore Ravens. Ezekiel Elliott surpassed Tony Dorsett's record of 1,007 rushing yards as a rookie. With the win, the Cowboys extended their winning streak to nine games for the first time in the team's franchise history. The win also saw the Cowboys beat the Ravens for the very first time.

Week 12: vs. Washington Redskins
Thanksgiving Day game

In the traditional Thanksgiving game, the Cowboys hosted the Washington Redskins, who had just came off a victory against the Green Bay Packers. In a game of catch-up, the Redskins never led; however, they made a valiant effort in the fourth quarter to take the lead. The Cowboys held them off and won the game, thus extending their winning streak to ten games for the first time in franchise history. This was also the first time since 2013 that the Cowboys would sweep the Redskins.

Week 13: at Minnesota Vikings

The Cowboys traveled to Minnesota to take on the struggling Vikings following their loss against the Detroit Lions on Thanksgiving. In a rather tightly contested game that saw penalties on Dallas and strong Vikings defense, the Cowboys nevertheless managed to win and thus extended their historical win streak to eleven games. This was also the first time since 1995 in which Dallas had won at Minnesota. With the win, plus a loss from the Washington Redskins against the Cardinals the following Sunday, Dallas became the first team in the NFL to clinch a playoff berth this season.

Week 14: at New York Giants

Trying to win their 12th straight and avenge their Week 1 loss, the Cowboys took on the second place New York Giants in a Sunday night showdown. After taking a 7–0 lead on their second possession of the game, the Cowboys failed to score any more points for the rest of the game and lost 10–7, thus ending their 11-game winning streak. Dak Prescott had his first multiple-interception game and the Cowboys committed three turnovers. It was the first time that they were swept in the regular season by the Giants since the 2011 season.

Week 15: vs. Tampa Bay Buccaneers

Following their second loss to the Giants, the Cowboys returned to Arlington in a match against the Tampa Bay Buccaneers (who were coming off a five-game winning streak). Despite both teams sharing the lead from time and time again, the Cowboys were able to hold off the Buccaneers. With less than a minute remaining in the fourth quarter, Orlando Scandrick intercepted a pass from Buccaneers quarterback Jameis Winston (who fumbled earlier in the first half) and ended the game as a Cowboys victory.

Dallas' only other highlight came early in the second quarter when Ezekiel Elliott leapt onto the Salvation Army kettle after scoring a touchdown to lead Dallas 10–3. This celebration resulted in a 15-yard unsportsmanlike conduct penalty; however, the following day, the NFL decided to not fine Elliott for the celebration.

The Cowboys improved to 12–2, and with the Giants' loss to the Eagles the following Thursday night, they clinched the NFC East title and home field advantage throughout the playoffs.

Week 16: vs. Detroit Lions

The Cowboys improved to 13–2 and swept the NFC North. They became the first team since the 2008 Tennessee Titans to sweep both the AFC and NFC North in the same regular season. They also won their 13th game in the regular season for the third time in franchise history, and first time since 2007. Dez Bryant threw his first touchdown pass of his career.

Week 17: at Philadelphia Eagles

With everything already clinched, the Cowboys rested numerous key starters, including Elliott and Sean Lee, and only played Dak Prescott for two series. Tony Romo played for the first time since November 2015 and in his one series, threw a touchdown pass to Terrance Williams. With the 27–13 loss, their first in Philadelphia since Week 8 of the 2011 season, the Cowboys finished the regular season 13–3, with a 3–3 record against NFC East competition, and a 10–0 record outside of the division.

Standings

Division

Conference

Postseason

Schedule

Game summaries

NFC Divisional Playoffs: vs. (4) Green Bay Packers

Despite having the #1 seed in the NFC and home-field advantage, the Cowboys' season came to an end in Dallas when they were defeated by the #4 seed Green Bay Packers 34–31, who avenged their Week 6 loss with a Mason Crosby field goal with just 3 seconds left in the game. For the first time since Week 14, Dak Prescott threw an interception as Packers safety Micah Hyde intercepted Prescott with 7:17 remaining in the third quarter.

With the loss, the Cowboys closed out their season with a 13–4 record.

References

External links

 
 

Dallas
Dallas Cowboys seasons
Dallas Cowboys
NFC East championship seasons
2010s in Dallas
2016 in Texas